Natalí Castillo  (born September 17, 1988) is a singer-songwriter from Buenos Aires, Argentina based in Madrid, Spain. In 2012, she released her debut album New Road (13 original songs).

Musical style 
Critics have compared Natali Castillo to Joni Mitchell or Rickie Lee Jones both in terms of song-writing ability and vocal style. 
When asked about her influences, Natali explains that she began listening to her dad's vinyl collections. She began listening to jazz, both instrumentals and vocal, like Teddy Wilson, John Coltrane, Bill Evans, Billie Holiday and Chet Baker. Later, she became slowly exposed to the music of Neil Young, Nick Drake, CSN&Y, Joni Mitchell and Simon & Garfunkel, among other 1960's folk singer-songwriters.

Discography

EP 
"From This Side"

Album 
"New Road" (2012)

References

Living people
1992 births
21st-century Argentine women singers
Singers from Buenos Aires
English-language singers from Argentina